is a 5 volume manga created by Setsuri Tsuzuki which began in Kadokawa Shoten's Monthly Asuka. The manga is licensed in English by Tokyopop.

Plot
The story is about Fujiwara Sunao, a high school student often mistaken as a boy because of her dressing up like a boy. Sunao also has the ability to control and manipulate water at will. She appears to be the uncaring type of heroine but quickly befriends the crossdressing school nurse Mr. Shizuki and the perverted Kureha among many others. Sunao is a heroine that acts as a counselor to help people that have problems and saves them from themselves and their painful pasts.

Characters
Fujiwara Sunao: a High School freshman with the power to manipulate water. Her carefree, independent attitude and insistence on dressing like a boy make her a difficult student, yet she has a soft spot for those in need. She has a hidden, tragic past, and is secretly the daughter of Izumi, the previous head of the Takatou family.
Ikushima Kureha: Sunao's classmate and a model student, Kureha harbors a wild streak and once attempted to set the school on fire. After being saved by Sunao, Kureha chose to vent her feelings in a more affectionate, if somewhat perverted, manner. She tends to hit on other girls (and a few boys here and there) with the same enthusiasm.
Shizuki Kaguya: The infamous and eccentric nurse at Sunao's school. He knows of Sunao's powers and also used to be a member of the Takatou family, but left for unknown reasons. He acts flamboyant but loudly proclaims himself as 'normal' regardless.
Hokage Minai: A quiet man who lives with Sunao and acts as her parental guardian, apparently because of his love for Sunao's mother, Izumi. Like Shizuki Kaguya, he was part of the Takatou family, but has cut ties with them.

References

External links

Official Tokyopop Broken Angel website

1999 manga
Fantasy anime and manga
Kadokawa Shoten manga
Romance anime and manga
Supernatural anime and manga
Tokyopop titles
Yuri (genre) anime and manga